Nicola Wheeler (born 4 April 1974) is an English actress. After appearing in the ITV soap opera Coronation Street in the recurring role of Melanie Tindel in 1999, Wheeler began portraying the role of Nicola King in the ITV soap opera Emmerdale. She has been in the role of Nicola since 2001, with a brief break in 2006 where she competed in Cirque de Celebrité.

Life and career
Wheeler was born on 4 April 1974 in Nelson, Lancashire and attended Walton High School. Wheeler began her career with appearances on television series including Derek Acorah's Ghost Towns and Kay Mellor's Gold. In 1999, she was cast in Coronation Street in the recurring role of Melanie Tindel. She joined Emmerdale as Nicola Blackstock in 2001 and served for five years before announcing her decision to leave. However, a year later, Wheeler announced her return to the soap. For her portrayal of the role, she won Best Bitch at the 2006 British Soap Awards. Wheeler appeared on the Sky One reality series Cirque de Celebrité; she was voted out on the fifth week by Blazin' Squad member Kenzie.

Filmography

Awards and nominations

References

External links
 

21st-century English actresses
Actresses from Lancashire
English soap opera actresses
English television actresses
Living people
People from Burnley
1974 births